Cyprinus qionghaiensis is a critically endangered species of fish in the genus Cyprinus from Qiong Lake in Yunnan, China.

References 

 

qionghaiensis
Fish described in 1981
Cyprinid fish of Asia